Hrašné is a village and municipality in Myjava District in the Trenčín Region of north-western Slovakia.

History
In historical records the village was first mentioned in 1955.

Geography
The municipality lies at an altitude of 341 metres and covers an area of 7.879 km². It has a population of about 505 people.

References

External links
  Official page

Villages and municipalities in Myjava District